The 6.5-300 Weatherby Magnum is a 6.5mm cartridge created by Weatherby in 2016 as its own rendition to the ever-growing 6.5mm long range rifle market.

Background
As what was then the newest in Weatherby's lineup, this cartridge was designed to directly compete with the 26 Nosler.

Performance
Claimed by Weatherby to be the fastest 6.5mm cartridge available.

Designed in a similar fashion as other Weatherby cartridges, it has a large-for-caliber case capacity, resulting in high velocities. When bullets with high ballistic coefficients are used, trajectories are extremely flat, allowing the projectile to retain a significant amount of energy downrange. These attributes make the 6.5-300 quite effective for long range hunting on medium-sized game.

Availability

Weatherby is currently the only manufacturer of rifles chambered in the 6.5-300 Weatherby Magnum, as well as the only current supplier of ammunition. However, cases could be formed from .300 Weatherby Magnum brass.

See also
 List of rifle cartridges
 Table of handgun and rifle cartridges

References

Pistol and rifle cartridges
Magnum rifle cartridges
Weatherby Magnum rifle cartridges